Moresby is a civil parish in the Borough of Copeland, Cumbria, England.  It contains three listed buildings that are recorded in the National Heritage List for England.  Of these, one is listed at Grade II*, the middle of the three grades, and the others are at Grade II, the lowest grade.  The parish lies to the east of the town of Whitehaven, and its listed buildings comprise a country house, a feature in its garden, and a nearby barn that has been converted into a theatre.

Key

Buildings

References

Citations

Sources

Lists of listed buildings in Cumbria